The Dorje Shugden controversy is a controversy over Dorje Shugden, also known as Dolgyal, whom some consider to be one of several protectors of the Gelug school, the school of Tibetan Buddhism to which the Dalai Lamas belong. Dorje Shugden has become the symbolic focal point of a conflict over the "purity" of the Gelug school and the inclusion of non-Gelug teachings, especially Nyingma ones.

In the 1930s, Pabongkhapa Déchen Nyingpo, who favoured an "exclusive" stance, started to promote Shugden as a major protector of the Gelug school, who harms any Gelug practitioner who blends his practice with non-Gelug practices. The conflict resurfaced with the publication of The Yellow Book in 1976, containing stories about Shugden's wrathful acts against Gelugpas who also practiced Nyingma teachings. In response, the 14th Dalai Lama, a Gelugpa himself and advocate of an "inclusive" approach (Rimé) to Tibetan Buddhism, began speaking out against the practice of Dorje Shugden in 1978.

The controversy attracted attention in the West following demonstrations by Dorje Shugden practitioners, especially Kelsang Gyatso's Britain-based New Kadampa Tradition, which broke away from the Gelug school in 1991. Other factions supporting Dorje Shugden are Serpom Monastic University and Shar Ganden Monastery, both of which separated from mainstream Gelug in 2008.

In April 2019, Tsem Tulku Rinpoche published an article summarizing statements made in 2016 by the Dalai Lama, which Rinpoche said equate to overt permission to practice Dorje Shugden, representing a complete reversal of the Dalai Lama's former position.

History

Pre-1930s
Dorje Shugden, also known as Dolgyal, originated as a gyalpo "angry and vengeful spirit" of South Tibet. Originally from the Sakya school as a minor protector that was part of the Three Gyalpo Kings (Shugden, Setrap, and Tsiu Marpo), Shugden was subsequently adopted as a "minor protector" of the Gelug, the newest of the schools of Tibetan Buddhism, headed by the Dalai Lamas (although nominally the Ganden Tripas).

1930s-1940s Pabongkha

Promotion of Dorje Shugden
In the 1930s, Pabongkhapa Déchen Nyingpo started to promote Dorje Shugden. According to Kay, Pabongka fashioned Shugden as a violent protector of the Gelug school, who is employed against other traditions, transforming Dorje Shugden's "marginal practice into a central element of the Ge-luk tradition", thus "replacing the traditional supra-mundane protectors of the Ge-luk tradition", namely  Mahākāla, Kalarupa, Vaiśravaṇa,  Palden Lhamo, Pehar and Nechung who were appointed by Je Tsongkhapa.

According to Georges Dreyfus, "Shuk-den was nothing but a minor Ge-luk protector before the 1930s when Pa-bong-ka started to promote him aggressively as the main Ge-luk protector." Dreyfus also notes, 

This change is reflected in artwork, since there is "lack of Dorje Shugden art in the Gelug school prior to the end of the 19th century."

Persecution of the Rimé movement 
Dorje Shugden was a key tool in Pabongkhapa's persecution of the flourishing Rimé movement, an ecumenical movement which fused the teachings of the Sakya, Kagyu and Nyingma, in response to the dominance of the Gelug school. Non-Gelug, especially Nyingma, monasteries were forced to convert to the Gelug position.

Pabongkhapa feared a decline of Gelug monasteries, and induced a revival movement, which promoted the Gelug as the only pure tradition. He regarded the practice of non-Gelug teachings by Gelug monks as a threat to the Gelug tradition, and opposed the influence of the other schools, especially the Nyingma. He coupled Dorje Shugden to Gelug exclusivism, using it against other traditions, and against Gelugpa's with eclectic tendencies. The main function of the deity was presented as "the protection of the Ge-luk tradition through violent means, even including the killing of its enemies."

Response by the 13th Dalai Lama
The abbot of Drepung Monastery and the 13th Dalai Lama were opposed to Pabongkapa's propitiation of Shugden. Restrictions on the practice of Shugden were implemented by the 13th Dalai Lama. Pabongkhapa apologized and promised not to engage in Shugden practices any more.

1970s

Publication of The Yellow Book
In 1975, The Yellow Book, also known as The Oral Transmission of the Intelligent Father, was published. It enumerates a series of stories that Zimey Rinpoche had heard informally from Trijang Rinpoche about ‘the many Ge-luk lamas whose lives are supposed to have been shortened by Shuk-den’s displeasure at their practicing Nying-ma teachings’. The text asserts the pre-eminence of the Gelug school which is symbolised and safeguarded by Dorje Shugden, and presents a stern warning to those within the Gelug whose eclectic tendencies would compromise the school's purity. The book provoked angry reactions from non-Gelug traditions, triggering a bitter literary exchange that drew on ‘all aspects of sectarian rivalry’.

Response by the 14th Dalai Lama

The 14th Dalai Lama publicly rejected The Yellow Book, which could only damage the common cause of the Tibetan people because of its sectarian divisiveness. In a series of talks, he sought to undermine the status elevation of Dorje Shugden by reaffirming the centrality of traditional supramundane protectors of the Gelug tradition. He also vehemently rejected Dorje Shugden's associated sectarianism, emphasising that all the Tibetan traditions are ‘equally profound dharmas’ and defending the ‘unbiased and eclectic’ approach to Buddhist practice as exemplified by the Second, Third and Fifth Dalai Lamas.

Scholar Donald S. Lopez Jr. explains, "The Dalai Lama’s renunciation of Shugden in 1976 caused great discord within the Geluk community, where devotion to the deity remained strong among the Geluk hierarchy and among large factions of the refugee lay community; spirited defenses of his worship were written and published. Some went so far as to claim that the Dalai Lama was not the true Dalai Lama, that the search party had selected the wrong child forty years before."

According to Georges Dreyfus, the sectarian elements of The Yellow Book were not unusual and do not "justify or explain the Dalai Lama's strong reaction." Instead, he traces back the conflict more on the exclusive/inclusive approach and maintain that to understand the Dalai Lama's point of view one has to consider the complex ritual basis for the institution of the Dalai Lamas, which was developed by the Great Fifth and rests upon "an eclectic religious basis in which elements associated with the Nyingma tradition combine with an overall Gelug orientation." This involves the promotion and practices of the Nyingma school. Kay reminds us, "[W]hen traditions come into conflict, religious and philosophical differences are often markers of disputes that are primarily economic, material and political in nature."

1980s 
Bluck notes the activity regarding Dorje Shugden practice in the 80s: "In the early 1980s the Dalai Lama restricted reliance on Dorje Shugden to private rather than public practice. The tension this caused within the Gelug and wider Tibetan community may reflect some opposition to his ecumenical approach."

1990s

Initiations by the 14th Dalai Lama
With the urging of the other schools who have long been opposed to Shugden, and his senior Gelug tutor who always doubted the practice, the 14th Dalai Lama asked the increasing number of western Shugden practitioners who were newly being proselytized primarily in Britain to refrain from attending his teachings. George Chryssides, quoting Steven Batchelor, states:

New Kadampa Tradition
The New Kadampa Tradition, founded by Kelsang Gyatso in 1991, has continued the worship of Dorje Shugden. Kelsang Gyatso regards his school to be the true continuation of the "pure" teachings of Je Tsongkhapa, rejecting the "inclusivism" of the Dalai Lama. Thurman notes that members of the New Kadampa Tradition, responded by trying 

Martin Mills states that:

DSRCS and SSC/WSS
In India, some protests and opposition were organised by the Dorje Shugden Religious and Charitable Society (DSRCS) with the support of the Shugden Supporters Community (SSC), now called Western Shugden Society.

In, 1996 the SSC attempted to obtain a statement from Amnesty International (AI) that the TGIE (specifically the 14th Dalai Lama) had violated human rights. However, the AI replied that the SSC's allegations were as yet unsubstantiated. Two years later, the AI stated in an official press release that complaints by Shugden practitioners fell outside its purview of "grave violations of fundamental human rights" (such as torture, the death penalty, extrajudicial executions, arbitrary detention or imprisonment, or unfair trials), adding that "while recognizing that a spiritual debate can be contentious, [we] cannot become involved in debate on spiritual issues." In itself, the nuanced statement neither asserted nor denied the validity of the claims made against the TGIE, just that they were not actionable according to AI's mandate.  

The DSRCS and Kundeling Lama filed a petition against the Central Tibetan Administration (CTA) and the Dalai Lama, accusing them of harassment and maltreatment. On 5 April 2010, Justice S. Muralidhar dismissed the petition, stating that allegations of violence and harassment were "vague averments" and that there as an "absence of any specific instances of any such attacks."

Murder of Lobsang Gyatso and two students
On February 4, 1997, the principal of the Buddhist School of Dialectics, Lobsang Gyatso, was murdered along with two of his students in Dharmasala . Kay notes "The subsequent investigation by the Indian police linked the murders to the Dorje Shugden faction of the exiled Tibetan community."

In a small 1978 pamphlet, Lobsang Gyatso alluded to a "knotless heretic teacher", which some people took as referring to Trijang Lobsang Yeshe Tenzin Gyatso and his advocacy of Shugden. According to Lobsang Gyatso's biographer, Gareth Sparham, many geshes and lamas were outraged over his criticism:

Georges Dreyfus added, "Despite being hurt by the polemical attack, Tri-jang Rin-po-che made it clear that violence was out of the question. Gradually, tempers cooled down and the incident was forgotten—or so it seemed."

In June 2007, the Times stated that Interpol had issued a Red notice to China for extraditing two of the alleged killers, Lobsang Chodak and Tenzin Chozin. Robert Thurman adds that the alleged killers had their origin within China as well. The Seattle Times reported, "The two men suspected of stabbing their victims are believed to have fled India. Five others, all linked to the Dorje Shugden Society in New Delhi, were questioned for months about a possible conspiracy. No one has been charged."

Kelsang Gyatso denied the involvement of any of his followers in the murder, and condemned the killings. Matthews notes that "In spite of speculation, no connection has been found between New Kadampa Tradition and the murders in Dharamsala"

2000s-present

Attempted murder
Trijang Chocktrul Rinpoche revealed an attempt to frame the Central Tibetan Administration with murder:

Trijang Chocktrul Rinpoche's declaration disturbed the image of a peaceful community, and the polemics against the Dalai Lama diminished for a long while.

Schism within the Gelug school
The Gelugpa school has three great monasteries, namely Sera, Ganden, and Drepung. In 2008, the Dorje Shugden controversy led to formal schism within the Gelug school. Pomra Khangtsen, one of the sixteen sections of Sera monastery, legally separated itself in India from the rest of Sera, continuing as "Serpom Monastic University" at Bylakuppe. Also in 2008, a section of Ganden Shartse at Mundgod similarly separated itself from Ganden and is now known as "Shar Ganden Monastery". In these institutions, the monks continue to worship Dorje Shugden as well as follow traditional curricula and other religious practices of their parent institutions. A few smaller Gelug monasteries have affiliated themselves with these two monasteries rather than with mainstream Gelug.

The present abbot of Serpom is Kyabje Yongyal and its acting abbot is Jampa Khetsun.  The present abbot of Shar Ganden is Lobsang Jinpa.

Protests
Hundreds of western Shugden practitioners have staged numerous demonstrations against the Dalai Lama, most recently in 2015 when he opened the Aldershot Buddhist Centre and in Cambridge, and 2014 in San Francisco, Berkeley, Washington, D.C., Oslo, Rotterdam, and Frankfurt.

In response, the Central Tibetan Administration (CTA) published different statements and corrections to the protesters' claims. They also posted two lists of Tibetan participants of the protests and a declaration by former NKT members and ex-practitioners of Dorje Shugden. International Campaign for Tibet also condemned the protests, stating in February 2015, "The way group has been denigrating the Dalai Lama is an affront to the Tibetan people and is causing great damage to the broader Tibetan issue."

Views

Views of opponents of Dorje Shugden practice

Ling Rinpoche
Ling Rinpoche, who was the Ganden Tripa and senior Gelug tutor to the 14th Dalai Lama,  was opposed to Shugden as he hailed from Drepung Monastery.

Views of the 14th Dalai Lama
The 14th Dalai Lama himself said in 2008, that he never used the word "ban", but "he strongly discourages Tibetan Buddhists" in practicing Shugden and "restricting a form of practice that restricts others’ religious freedom is actually a protection of religious freedom. So in other words, negation of a negation is an affirmation". The advice of the 14th Dalai Lama was approved by the Central Tibetan Administration and the Parliament in exile in 1996. It was then gradually implemented into a ban starting from 1997 by the Tibetan Youth Congress including enforcement measures like imposing all spiritual masters to stop worshipping Shugden "in the interest of the Dalai Lama and Tibetan Independence" or urging all other Tibetan organizations and communities to expel anyone who venerates Shugden.

Several reasons for the 14th Dalai Lama's stance have been given. According to John Makransky, 

According to Kapstein, the 14th Dalai Lama is "focused upon the role of Shugden as a militantly sectarian protector of the Gelukpa order, and the harm that has been done to Tibetan sectarian relations by the cult's more vociferous proponents."

According to Dreyfus, the 14th Dalai Lama stance stems from his favoring the traditional Gelug traditions and protectors rather than Shugden:

Views of Shugden practitioners

Kelsang Gyatso
In an interview with scholar Donald Lopez on the controversy, Kelsang Gyatso explains: 

In the interview, Kelsang Gyatso states:

According to Kelsang Gyatso, 

According to David Kay, Kelsang Gyatso departs from Pabongkhapa and Trijang Rinpoche by stating that Dorje Shugden's appearance is enlightened, rather than worldly. According to Kay, "Geshe Kelsang takes the elevation of Dorje Shugden’s ontological status another step further, emphasising that the deity is enlightened in both essence and appearance." He quotes Kelsang Gyatso on Dorje Shugden's appearance: "Some people believe that Dorje Shugdan is an emanation of Manjushri who shows the aspect of a worldly being, but this is incorrect. Even Dorje Shugdan’s form reveals the complete stages of the path of Sutra and Tantra, and such qualities are not possessed by the forms of worldly beings." According to Kay, Kelsang Gyatso downplays the oracle of Shugden, since it conflicts with his notion of Shugden being a Buddha:

Third-party views

Dorje Shugden Practitioners
According to Dreyfus, "The irony is that Shuk-den is presented by his followers as the protector of the Ge-luk (dge lugs) school, of which the Dalai Lama is the (de facto) leader."

According to Buddhist professor and Nyingma teacher John Markansky:

New Kadampa Tradition / Western Shugden Society claims
Scholar Jane Ardley explains the development of the claims of the WSS:

Chryssides goes on to explain the claims specifically:

Ardley explains the political nature of the controversy:

Rejection of New Kadampa Tradition / Western Shugden Society claims
Some scholars reject the claims of the New Kadampa Tradition (NKT) and the Western Shugden Society (WSS). Robert Thurman, for example, states, "The cult and agency attack campaign is futile since its main claims are so easy to refute." Some scholars reject NKT/WSS claims that the 14th Dalai Lama has suppressed religious freedom, indicating that the situation is actually the opposite. Thurman says, "They then went on the attack, claiming they had been 'banned' and 'excommunicated', etc., when in fact the Dalai Lama was exercising his religious freedom by not accepting students who reject his advice, and actually go so far as to condemn him!"

Thurman explains:

Regarding NKT/WSS claims that there is prohibition of Shugden, and therefore a repression of religious freedom, Thierry Dodin states, "No, such a prohibition does not exist. Religious freedom is not at issue here. No one, and most definitely not the Dalai Lama, is repressing religious freedom."

Nathan W. Hill, Lecturer in Tibetan and Linguistics at SOAS, University of London, states that the Dalai Lama does not control the Indian government or any other government:

Similarly, Tibet scholar Robert Barnett of Columbia University states that "ID cards are not given out by the Tibetan government in exile, but by the Indian authorities".

Barnett comments:

Barnett noted that after the Dalai Lama prohibited his followers from engaging in Shugden rituals, Shugden practitioners in the Tibetan exile community faced persecution that the Dalai Lama's administration did not deal with particularly well, and he expressed concern that the controversy could hurt Tibetan causes. But Barnett said that claiming the difficulties faced by the Shugden practitioners are not a major human rights concern: "We see this being done under the name of human rights, which is not really quite what is at issue here."

New Kadampa Tradition demonstrations

Tibetologist Thierry Dodin states that it is the New Kadampa Tradition "that since the 1990s has held spectacular demonstrations whenever the Dalai Lama went to the West." According to Dodin, "The demonstrators are almost exclusively western monks and nuns, ordained in the New Kadampa Tradition (NKT) according to the group’s own ritual." Dodin also states, "The NKT can be described typologically as a cult on the basis of its organisational form, its excessive group pressure and blind obedience to its founder. The organisation’s extreme fanaticism and aggressive missionary drive are typical cult features too."

According to Robert Thurman, the International Shugden Community is a front group of the New Kadampa Tradition.

There is a group of former members who speak out against the New Kadampa Tradition and their demonstrations.

Chinese government involvement
A 2015 Reuters article alleged "that the religious sect behind the protests has the backing of the Communist Party" and that the "group has emerged as an instrument in Beijing’s long campaign to undermine support for the Dalai Lama". The allegations have been challenged as they were not substantiated by concrete evidence.

According to Robert Thurman, Shugden activities are financed by the United Front Work Department of the Chinese Communist Party (CCP) as part of its strategy against the Dalai Lama, but there is "no documentary proof of a direct link between the NKT front groups ISC or WSS and the Communist United Front".

Raimondo Bultrini documents the Chinese government coordination of Shugden activity in the book The Dalai Lama and the King Demon.

Warren Smith asserts that within Chinese-controlled territory, the Chinese government demanded that monks worship Shugden, in conjunction with forcing them to denounce the Dalai Lama and fly the flag of China.

According to Ben Hillman,

According to the Tibetologist Thierry Dodin, "China had encouraged division among the Tibetans by promoting followers of the Dorje Shugden sect to key positions of authority.

He also provides a couple of examples of the Chinese government's role in Shugden activity:

Also the Central Tibetan Administration in India has stated that "In order to undermine the peace and harmony within the Tibetan people, China provides political and financial support to Shugden worshippers in Tibet, India and Nepal in particular, and in general, across the globe." And, in an on-line article published by the Times of India, a source in the Religion and Culture Department of the Tibetan Government in exile is quoted as saying that Dorje Shugden followers "have their people in all Tibetan settlements. We are worried about their sources of funding. It might be China or some other anti-Tibetan elements."

In December 2012, Lama Jampa Ngodrup, a promoter of the practice of Dorje Shugden, apparently became "the first Tibetan lama to be appointed by the Chinese Government to travel on an official trip abroad to give Dharma teachings."

According to propaganda observers, “the de-facto ban issued by the 14th Dalai Lama has generated considerable social tension and division in the diaspora, as well as in Tibetan society within China, leading the Chinese government to consider the Dorje Shugden controversy an important front for undermining what it says are efforts promoted by the 14th Dalai Lama aimed at destabilizing China. The religious hostility has been fed by considerable propaganda and counterpropaganda efforts during the last two decades … Significantly sensitive are the methodical efforts of the exiled government and its supporting NGOs to silence opposing voices in the controversy, using systematic defamation and coercive methods, including the use of modern disinformation means like coordinated troll campaigns on social media.”

Dissolution of International Shugden Community

In 2015, Reuters printed allegations that the anti-Dalai Lama Shugden protest campaigns were funded and manipulated by the Chinese Communist Party in order to discredit the Dalai Lama and the so-called "Dalai clique".

On March 10, 2016, the International Shugden Community suddenly suspended all operations. Its website was closed down leaving only the following message: "A Special Announcement: The Directors of the International Shugden Community previously announced that from 1 Dec 2015 they had decided to completely stop organising demonstrations against the Dalai Lama. Now, from the 10th March 2016 the International Shugden Community itself will dissolve, including its websites. May everybody be happy. Len Foley, Representative of the International Shugden Community." They added, "We are campaigning for an end to the discrimination against the people of our faith that the Dalai Lama has created"

Tsem Tulku Rinpoche on ending the ban
Tsem Tulku Rinpoche, ordained at 22 by the 14th Dalai Lama, stood against the position of the Central Tibetan Administration in the Dorje Shugden controversy, and built the world's largest Dorje Shugden statue.

In February 2018, Tsem Rinpoche wrote:

In April 2019, he penned an article titled Dalai Lama Says We Can Practise Dorje Shugden Finally! In it, he writes, "His Holiness the Dalai Lama has compassionately shown a change in approach to the Dorje Shugden situation, and we are grateful for this...The gravity and levity of His Holiness the Dalai Lama’s announcements is very, very deep and also transcends everything." Rinpoche points to a 2016 video showing comments made by the Dalai Lama, as well as an article in Phayul.com from the same year, and an article on the Dalai Lama's website, all of which he summarized thusly:

See also
Tibetan Buddhism
Gelug
New Kadampa Tradition

Notes

References

Sources

Printed sources

Web sources

External links

Academic
 Academic Research regarding Shugden Controversy & New Kadampa Tradition
 
History
 

 
 
Protests
 
Pro Dalai Lama
 Official Web TV Station of the Central Tibetan Administration – includes BBC documentary "An Unholy Row" and Second Shugden Documentary filmed by Swiss TV in 1998
 Collection of Advice Regarding Shugden by the FPMT
 The Central Tibetan Administration on "Dolgyal (Shugden)"
 Tibetan Buddhism in the West - Dorje Shugden
Pro-Shugden
 Website of the New Kadampa Tradition
 Dorje Shugden and Dalai Lama – Spreading Dharma Together

 
Politics of Tibet
Tibetan Buddhism-related controversies
New Kadampa Tradition